Acrolepia chalcolampra is a moth of the  family Acrolepiidae. It was described by Edward Meyrick in 1931. It is found in Chile.

References

Moths described in 1931
Acrolepiidae
Endemic fauna of Chile